The Hungarian water polo league system, or Hungarian water polo league pyramid is a series of interconnected competitions for professional water polo clubs in Hungary. The system has a hierarchical format with a promotion and demotion system between competitions at different levels.

Men

The tier levels
For the 2015–16 season, the Hungarian water polo league system is as follows:

Cup competitions

Magyar Kupa (men's water polo) (Férfi Magyar Kupa)

Magyar Kupa (women's water polo) (Női Magyar Kupa)

External links
Hungarian Water Polo Federation 

Water polo in Hungary
Sports league systems